Hirror Enniffer is the first studio album by American post-rock band Mamiffer. It was released through Hydra Head Records on September 23, 2008. The album was recorded, mixed and produced by Chris Common with mastering by Ed Brooks at RFI Mastering in Seattle.

Track listing
 "This Land" – 6:15
 "Death Shawl" – 4:10
 "Annwn" – 5:43
 "Black Running Water" – 6:14
 "Suckling a Dead Litter" – 7:37
 "Cyhraeth" – 4:35

Personnel

Mamiffer
 Faith Coloccia– piano, vocals, glockenspiel, melodica, bells, mellotron, electric piano, percussion (jars, chains), synthesizer, loops, organ, acoustic guitar
 Aaron Turner – guitar, acoustic guitar, bass

Additional musicians
 Chris Common – percussion, drums, bells, effects
 Brian Cook – bass
 Annie Hozoji Matheson-Margullis – cello, additional vocals
 Ryan Frederiksen – guitar
 Kelly Akashi – additional vocals
 Sarine Ashjian – additional vocals
 Will Adams – additional vocals

Production
 Ed Brooks – mastering
 Chris Common – engineering, producer, mixing

References

2008 debut albums
Mamiffer albums
Hydra Head Records albums